Kyenvu is a 2018 Ugandan short film written, produced and directed by Kemiyondo Coutinho and starring still Kemiyondo Coutinho, Michael Wawuyo Jr. in lead roles and supported by Rehema Nanfuka, Joel Okuyo Atiku, Alex Bwanika and others. The film is Kemiyondo Coutinho’s directorial and production début and won the Pan African Film Festival (PAFF)’s Best Narrative Short Film.

Premise
A recently returned brown (yellow) girl is tipped off by a passenger guy in a taxi when the taxi conductor tries to cheat her. The passenger offers to pay her fare and what follows is a game of cat and mouse between the girl and the guy.

Production
Kyenvu is set in a taxi, a 14 seater matatu. According to Kemiyondo Coutinho, girls are ridiculed for their dressing in taxis, roadsides and everywhere. She wrote Kyenvu in 2014 when the "Anti-Pornography" had passed in Uganda.  Kyenvu is a Luganda word meaning yellow colour, which is used as a metaphor in the film and generally in Uganda to describe a brown girl. The film uses colour to expose the problems faced by girls of a different colour shed. Browner girls are prone to a number of challenges including catcalls, gang rapes, groping and so on.
The film was edited by Peter Mukiibi, Isaac Ekuka was director of photography and sound by Moses Bwayo.

Music
Kyenvu uses accurate scoring, soundtracks and original compositions. The songs used were performed by artistes that had previously performed at her A Ka Dope sessions.

Awards

References

External links 
 

2018 films
Ugandan short films
Films shot in Uganda
Films set in Uganda
2010s English-language films
Ugandan drama films